Wyatt Borso (born March 8, 2004, in Chicago, Illinois), is an American professional soccer player who played two seasons as a winger / forward for the USL Championship club Pittsburgh Riverhounds and currently with the Fighting Irish of Notre Dame in the ACC.

Borso is predominantly known for his speed, strength, and stamina, but also possesses good technique and ball control. His two footed skills, combined with his acceleration and physicality, allow him to get past defenders regularly and make runs into space, where he is able to score or create.  In addition to his athletic and offensive capabilities, Borso has also drawn praise for his work-rate and defensive contribution off the ball.  Soccerwire.com reports him right foot dominant. ESPN.com states his height at 6'1" and weight at 181 lbs.

Pittsburgh Riverhounds 
On April 19, 2021, Pittsburgh Riverhounds SC signed 17 years and 1 month old forward Wyatt Borso for the 2021 season. Borso's signing marked the first time the club has brought a player into its first team on a USL Academy contract.  The USL referenced it "a historic signing in Pittsburgh". 

He made his preseason pro debut on May 1, 2021, in the 75th minute against the Philadelphia Union II. He made his regular season pro debut on August 11, 2021, in a 3–2 loss to Miami FC. He made his first professional start on September 4, 2021, against San Antonio FC that ended in a 1–1 draw.Borso, a native of Aurora, Ill. was included in TopDrawerSoccer.com USL Championship: 10 Amateurs To Know, in which he was called "one of the most interesting additions in the USL offseason." After the end of the 2021 season, Borso was cited as one of the "Best 5 Moments of the Year". 

He returned to Pittsburgh for his second season in 2022.  After scoring multiple times in preseason off starts, Borso got an early regular season start on March 26, 2022, against Detroit City FC in 1-1 draw, where his shot required Save of the Week USL honors and setup corner for goal . His next start came April 5, 2022, in the Second Round of the US Open Cup where he played 90 minutes and assisted the second goal in a 2–0 win against Maryland Bobcats where "17-year-old Wyatt Borso drilled a cross the width of the pitch," according to TheCup.US "Wyatt Borso became the youngest player to record an assist for the Hounds (18 years, 28 days) when he hit a cross-field diagonal ball to Sims" according to USL Championship.com.

Biography 
Borso began his youth career with Chicago Sockers FC (Ill.) before moving to the Chicago Fire FC Academy in the 2018–19 season. He was also called up to U15 youth camps in Chula Vista, CA for the United States Men's National Soccer Team, and in 2018 he was the top goal scorer in U.S. Soccer Development Academy play with 43 goals.

At Chicago Fire, he won the Montreal International Academie Tournament Top Goal Scorer Award along with teammate Gabriel 'Gaga' Slonina who won "Goalkeeper of the Tournament" and was later sold to Chelsea.  In 2019 he made DA Playoffs Best XI, as well as leading the attack in Bell Sport Cup International Tournament in Poland in goals/assist and international friendlies in Mexico.  In 2020 he was a Generation Adidas Cup TDS Stand Out Player.

The USL Academy contract in Pittsburgh allowed him to train daily with and play for the pro first team in the USL Championship while still maintaining amateur NCAA eligibility. A Notre Dame recruit, Borso is rated as a four-star prospect and one of the top 10 forwards in the Class of 2022 by TopDrawerSoccer.com.

References 

Living people
2004 births
American soccer players
Soccer players from Illinois
Association football wingers
Association football forwards
USL Championship players
Pittsburgh Riverhounds SC players